The 2014 Challenge Cup Final was the 113th cup-deciding game of the rugby league 2014 Challenge Cup Season. It was held at Wembley Stadium in London on 23 August 2014, kick off 15:00. The final was contested by Castleford Tigers and Leeds Rhinos. The game saw Leeds beat Castlefordby 23 points to 10.

Background

The 2014 Challenge Cup Final would be Castleford Tigers's first cup final of the Super League era, having last featured as runners-up to Wigan Warriors in the 1992 Challenge Cup Final. By contrast, their opponents, Leeds Rhinos, have featured in nine Challenge during that period since 1992 but only winning one of them, the 1999 Challenge Cup Final, the last at the original Wembley Stadium.

Route to the final

Castleford Tigers
As a 2013 Super League team, Castleford Tigers entered in at the fourth round. They drew Championship side Batley Bulldogs beating them by 48 points to 10. The fifth round saw the Tigers face Championship opposition again, in the form of Sheffield Eagles, who they beat 60 points to 16. The quarter finals saw them comfortably beat eventual Super League runners-up Wigan Warriors 16 points to 4, before a semi-final victory over Widnes Vikings put them in the final.

Leeds Rhinos
As a 2013 Super League team, Leeds Rhinos also entered in at the fourth round. A fourth round thrashing of Wakefield Trinity Wildcats 60 points to 6 placed them in the fifth round where a comfortable victory over eventual Super League champions St Helens, winning by 20 points. The Rhinos faced Championship side Leigh Centurions, beating them 25 points to 12, before beating Warrington Wolves in the semis who'd eventually finish one place above them in the league.

Match details

Post match

Leeds Rhinos won their first Challenge Cup in 15 years, having last won in 1999 and having achieved six  runners-up places in that time frame. This marked their twelfth victory in the competition.

References

Challenge Cup finals
Castleford Tigers
Leeds Rhinos matches
August 2014 sports events in the United Kingdom
2014 sports events in London